Camp Sherman can refer to:
Camp Sherman, Nebraska, an earlier name for Fort Omaha
Camp Sherman, Ohio
Camp Sherman, Oregon